Tales of the South Seas is an Australian TV series loosely based on Jack London's 1912 novel A Son of the Sun.

Plot

Set at the turn of the 20th century, Tales of the South Seas follows David Grief, captain of The Rattler, and his Polynesian friend and partner, Mauriri Lepau, on their adventures in the Pacific South Sea Islands.  After helping to prove her innocence after being falsely accused of murder, they are often joined by Isabelle Reed, a stable owner on the island.

Cast
 William Snow as David Grief
 Rene Naufahu as Mauriri Lepau
 Rachel Blakely as Isabelle Reed
 Rowena King as Lavinia Timoto
 Mark Lee as Rev. Colin Trent
 Kimberley Joseph as Claire Devon
 Adrian Wright as Lt. Jean Morlais

Episodes

References

External links
 
 Fan site

1990s Australian television series
English-language television shows
Television series by South Pacific Pictures
Television series set in the 1910s